Alliance High School is a public high school in Alliance, Ohio, United States. It is the only high school in the Alliance City School District. Athletic teams compete as the Alliance Aviators in the Ohio High School Athletic Association as a member of the Eastern Buckeye Conference.

Athletics
Sports teams are known as the Aviators for the airplane production plants in the area during the 1920s. The school has its own A-7 Corsair II outside the building.

OHSAA State Championships
 Boys Track and Field – 1976, 1984, 2005
 Boys Cross Country - 1983
 Football - 1958
 Girls Golf - 2009
 Wrestling - 1979

Notable alumni
 Len Dawson, Pro Football Hall of Fame quarterback
 Gertrude Alice Kay, children's book illustrator and author

Notes and references

External links
 Official site

Alliance High School
Alliance, Ohio
Public high schools in Ohio
1868 establishments in Ohio
Educational institutions established in 1868